Gypsy Woman is a 2001 film directed by Sheree Folkson and written by Steven Knight, filmed on location in London and The Isle of Man. It is a romantic comedy, set against the backdrop of the Black Mountains, Wales.

Plot overview 
'Leon Hawthorne (Davenport) is a recently widowed property developer left to raise his young daughter on his own. While at a coroner’s inquest into the death of one of his workers, Leon meets the dead man’s widow, Natalie (McIntosh). A bright and exotic woman, Natalie’s beauty captivates Leon and after the verdict of the court case comes, he sets out to track the widow down. This brings him into the countryside and on an unexpected journey full of humour, danger and self-discovery as he enters the world of the gypsies... With the help of Leon’s and Natalie’s daughters, they just might manage to sort it out.'

References

External links

2001 films
2001 romantic comedy films
Films about Romani people
Films set in Wales
Films shot in the Isle of Man
Films shot in London
Films with screenplays by Steven Knight
2000s English-language films
2001 directorial debut films
Films directed by Sheree Folkson